EC586, also known as testosterone 17β-(1-((5-(aminosulfonyl)-2-pyridinyl)carbonyl)--proline), is an androgen and anabolic steroid which is under development by Evestra for use in androgen replacement therapy in men. It is an orally active androgen ester – specifically, a C17β sulfonamide–proline ester of the natural and bioidentical androgen testosterone – and acts as a prodrug of testosterone in the body. However, unlike oral testosterone and conventional oral testosterone esters such as testosterone undecanoate, EC586 has high oral potency, may undergo little or no first-pass metabolism, and may not have disproportionate androgenic effects in the liver. As such, it may have a variety of desirable advantages over oral testosterone, similarly to parenteral testosterone, but with the convenience of oral administration. Evestra intends to seek Investigational New Drug status for EC586 in the fourth quarter of 2018.

Relative to parenteral routes of testosterone like transdermal and injection, oral testosterone is characterized by very low bioavailability, a short duration of action, and disproportionate effects on liver protein synthesis. In relation to its low oral bioavailability, testosterone is almost inactive via the oral route, and has not been commercially marketed in an oral formulation. The C17β undecanoate ester of testosterone, testosterone undecanoate, shows somewhat improved oral bioavailability (7%) due to some absorption through the lymphatic system, and is the only oral form of testosterone that is marketed for medical use. However, aside from its marginally improved oral bioavailability, testosterone undecanoate has many of the same issues that oral testosterone has. It has a short duration and must be taken 2 to 4 times per day; it is not absorbed under fasting conditions and must be taken with a meal that contains at least a moderate amount of fat (19 g); it results in a disproportionate and unphysiological increase in circulating dihydrotestosterone levels due to first-pass metabolism; there is high interindividual variability in testosterone levels achieved; and it can cause gastrointestinal side effects; among other issues. Because of its limitations, oral testosterone undecanoate has modest clinical effectiveness relative to injected testosterone esters and is considered to be a secondary choice for therapy.

The pharmacokinetics of oral EC586 have been briefly assessed in rats in a small pilot study. Oral EC586 showed area-under-the-curve (AUC) levels that were more than 100-fold greater than those of oral testosterone propionate, the C17β propionate ester of testosterone (AUC0-3h = 330 ng/mL and 2.5 ng/mL, respectively, for doses of 3.0 mg/rat each). As such, EC586 would appear to possess strongly increased oral bioavailability, potency, and systemic exposure relative to testosterone propionate. Additional research and details on the pharmacokinetics and properties of EC586 are to be published "soon".

The mechanism for the absence of first-pass metabolism and lack of disproportionate liver exposure with oral administration has been elucidated for a closely related sulfonamide–proline estradiol ester known as EC508, which shows the same properties as EC586. It is thought to be due to reversible binding of the sulfonamide moiety of EC508 to an enzyme called carbonic anhydrase II (CAII). CAII is highly concentrated in erythrocytes (red blood cells), which are present in large quantity in the blood of the hepatic portal vein. It is believed that following its absorption in the intestines and its entrance into the hepatic portal vein, EC508 is taken up by and massively accumulated in erythrocytes, which prevents it from entering the liver and results in it being transported by erythrocytes straight into the circulation. From circulating erythrocytes, EC508 is thought to be slowly released and then hydrolyzed into estradiol, an estrogen and the active hormonal form of EC508. However, one sulfonamide estradiol ester related to EC508 known as EC518 showed similar properties with very low or absent binding to CAII and hence probably lacking erythrocyte binding, which raises questions as to whether or how this is possible as well as about the necessity of CAII binding for such properties. In any case, whatever the mechanisms, they are likely to be in common for EC508 and EC586.

EC508 is also under development by Evestra, specifically as an estrogen and potent oral estradiol prodrug for use in menopausal hormone therapy in women and as a hormonal contraceptive to prevent pregnancy in women.

See also 
 List of androgen esters § Testosterone esters
 List of investigational sex-hormonal agents § Androgenics

References

External links 
 R&D Research / Research Pipeline - Evestra, Inc. 

Amino acids
Androgens and anabolic steroids
Androstanes
Experimental drugs
Enones
Pyridines
Prodrugs
Sulfamates
Testosterone
Testosterone esters